In mathematics and theoretical computer science, a k-regular sequence is a sequence satisfying linear recurrence equations that reflect the base-k representations of the integers. The class of k-regular sequences generalizes the class of k-automatic sequences to alphabets of infinite size.

Definition
There exist several characterizations of k-regular sequences, all of which are equivalent. Some common characterizations are as follows. For each, we take R′ to be a commutative Noetherian ring and we take R to be a ring containing R′.

k-kernel
Let k ≥ 2. The k-kernel of the sequence  is the set of subsequences

The sequence  is (R′, k)-regular (often shortened to just "k-regular") if the -module generated by Kk(s) is a finitely-generated R′-module.

Linear combinations
A sequence s(n) is k-regular if there exists an integer E such that, for all ej > E and 0 ≤ rj ≤ kej − 1, every subsequence of s of the form s(kejn + rj) is expressible as an R′-linear combination , where cij is an integer, fij ≤ E, and 0 ≤ bij ≤ kfij − 1.

Alternatively, a sequence s(n) is k-regular if there exist an integer r and subsequences s1(n), ..., sr(n) such that, for all 1 ≤ i ≤ r and 0 ≤ a ≤ k − 1, every sequence si(kn + a) in the k-kernel Kk(s) is an R′-linear combination of the subsequences si(n).

Formal series
Let x0, ..., xk − 1 be a set of k non-commuting variables and let τ be a map sending some natural number n to the string xa0 ... xae − 1, where the base-k representation of x is the string ae − 1...a0. Then a sequence s(n) is k-regular if and only if the formal series  is -rational.

Automata-theoretic
The formal series definition of a k-regular sequence leads to an automaton characterization similar to Schützenberger's matrix machine.

History
The notion of k-regular sequences was first investigated in a pair of papers by Allouche and Shallit. Prior to this, Berstel and Reutenauer studied the theory of rational series, which is closely related to k-regular sequences.

Examples

Ruler sequence
The ruler sequence  is -regular, and the -kernel

These basis elements lead to the recurrence relations

Thue–Morse sequence
The Thue–Morse sequence t(n) is the fixed point of the morphism 0 → 01, 1 → 10. It is known that the Thue–Morse sequence is 2-automatic. Thus, it is also 2-regular, and its 2-kernel

Cantor numbers
The sequence of Cantor numbers c(n) consists of numbers whose ternary expansions contain no 1s. It is straightforward to show that 

and therefore the sequence of Cantor numbers is 2-regular. Similarly the Stanley sequence
0, 1, 3, 4, 9, 10, 12, 13, 27, 28, 30, 31, 36, 37, 39, 40, ... 
of numbers whose ternary expansions contain no 2s is also 2-regular.

Sorting numbers
A somewhat interesting application of the notion of k-regularity to the broader study of algorithms is found in the analysis of the merge sort algorithm. Given a list of n values, the number of comparisons made by the merge sort algorithm are the sorting numbers, governed by the recurrence relation

As a result, the sequence defined by the recurrence relation for merge sort, T(n), constitutes a 2-regular sequence.

Other sequences
If  is an integer-valued polynomial, then  is k-regular for every .

The Glaisher–Gould sequence is 2-regular. The Stern–Brocot sequence is 2-regular.

Allouche and Shallit give a number of additional examples of k-regular sequences in their papers.

Properties
k-regular sequences exhibit a number of interesting properties.
Every k-automatic sequence is k-regular.
Every k-synchronized sequence is k-regular.
A k-regular sequence takes on finitely many values if and only if it is k-automatic. This is an immediate consequence of the class of k-regular sequences being a generalization of the class of k-automatic sequences.
The class of k-regular sequences is closed under termwise addition, termwise multiplication, and convolution. The class of k-regular sequences is also closed under scaling each term of the sequence by an integer λ. In particular, the set of k-regular power series forms a ring.
If  is k-regular, then for all integers ,  is k-automatic. However, the converse does not hold. 
For multiplicatively independent k, l ≥ 2, if a sequence is both k-regular and l-regular, then the sequence satisfies a linear recurrence. This is a generalization of a result due to Cobham regarding sequences that are both k-automatic and l-automatic.
The nth term of a k-regular sequence of integers grows at most polynomially in n.

Proving and disproving k-regularity
This is usually computationally straightforward.

Here is one example of such a proof.

The sequence  can be shown to be 2-regular. The sequence  is, however, not 2-regular, by the following argument. Suppose  is 2-regular. The function  is surjective onto the integers, so let  be the least integer such that .

Then for every ,

and on the right-hand side,

It follows that for every integer ,

Therefore,  is not 2-regular.

Notes

References
.
.

Combinatorics on words
Automata (computation)
Integer sequences
Recurrence relations